Edward Nelson (1932–2014) was an American mathematician.

Edward Nelson or Ed Nelson may also refer to:

Edward William Nelson (1855–1934), American naturalist and ethnologist
Edward Nelson (Alamo defender) (born 1816)
Edward Nelson (marine biologist) (1883–1923), member of the Terra Nova Expedition
Edward Nelson, 5th Earl Nelson (1860–1951)
Edward Nelson Jr. (1931–2018), United States Coast Guard admiral
Edward Theophilus Nelson (1874–1940), British barrister
Ed Nelson (1928–2014), American actor
Ed Nelson (baseball) (fl. 1940s), American baseball player
Ed Nelson (basketball) (Edward Richard Nelson, born 1982), American basketball player

See also

Edwin Nelson (disambiguation)
Ned Nelson (1911–1977), American college baseball and basketball player
Ted Nelson (disambiguation)
Ed Neilson, American politician